Emma C. Berry is a fishing sloop located at the Mystic Seaport Museum in Mystic, Connecticut, United States, and one of the oldest surviving commercial vessels in America. She is the last known surviving American well smack. This type of boat is also termed a sloop smack or Noank smack. The Noank design was imitated in other regions of the United States. 

Emma C. Berry was built in 1866 at the Palmer Shipyards in Noank, Connecticut by James A. Latham.  The boat was named for Captain John Henry Berry's daughter. In 1886 she was rigged as a schooner, and in 1916 a gasoline engine was added. She was restored in 1931 to her original condition. She was declared a National Historic Landmark in 1994.

Construction 
The Emma C. Berry was built in 1865 by John Latham in the R. & J. Palmer Shipyard in Noank, Connecticut for John Henry Berry. The ship was named after his daughter and constructed in a similar way to other Noank smacks. The ship was launched in 1866 with a sloop rig and two head-sails.

History
Originally, John Henry Berry had a 1/2 stake with Moses Wilbur, William Latham, Charles Spencer and Amos Lanplear each owning 1/8 stake. Ownership changed by September 1866, with Berry having no stake in the ship. In 1870, the ship was owned by Henry Chapel with 5/8 and Henry Brown with 3/8. In 1872, Robert Westcote was the sole owner and master of the Emma C. Berry. Henry Chapel became the managing owner in 1886 and the sole owner in 1887, and then she was re-rigged as schooner. It changed ownership several times from 1895 to 1910, when it became owned by the Marston Lobster Pound Co. (5/8), Sargent Land and Co. (1/8) and by Charles A. Baker (2/8). Just two years later in 1918, S. A. Skilling and Son had a 6/8 stake and Clarence A. Baker retained his 2/8th stake. From 1918 through 1929 various individuals came to own her. Her career as a fishing vessel ended around 1924 and she was left on the flats of Beals, Maine. In 1926, she was purchased by Milton Beal and used as a coastal freighter. 

F. Slade Dale purchased the ship in 1931, restored it and registered the ship in Philadelphia. Dale retained ownership until it was donated to the Mystic Seaport in 1969. Captain Dayton O. Newton, bandmaster at Admiral Farragut Academy (Pine Beach, NJ) and captain of the Schooner Adventure (Camden, ME) met Dale in the early 1960s and offered to assemble a volunteer crew of Admiral Farragut Academy cadets to work on the Berry.  Newton convinced Dale that she should sail back to the yard in Noank 100 years following her launch.  In 1965 Captain Newton and volunteers sailed the ship on a shakedown cruise up the Hudson to Troy, NY carrying a cargo of historical documents to the Albany Historical Society. During this shakedown cruise, Pete Seeger came aboard for a concert from the Berry raising funds for his soon to be built Clearwater.

In 1992, the Emma C. Berry sailed from the Mystic Seaport down to Fishers Island Sound under sloop rig, for the first time in 106 years.

Alterations 
The Emma C. Berry has undergone numerous alterations in rigging, modification and repairs throughout its career before undergoing an extensive restoration to return it to its original configuration. The original sloop was rerigged as a schooner in 1887 and Will Beal installed a Knox gasoline engine around 1916. Woodward and Hopkins changed the ship to a freighter and Milton Beal would later remove the well. In 1963, a $5000 "restoration" of the ship was used to make her seaworthy.

The ship's tonnage varies according to the official records. In 1894 and 1897, at 15.76 gross tons and 14.96 net tons. In 1912 and 1915, it registered 15 gross tons and 14 net tons.

Restoration 
After its arrival at the Mystic Seaport, the Emma C. Berry underwent the first phase of its restoration, lasting from 1969 to 1971. The restoration restored the original sloop rig and wet well and renewed the stanchions and rotting frames and floor timbers. After additional research and a collection of photographs were acquired, the Mystic Seaport began a second restoration from to restore the deck, horn timbers, spar ironwork and sails. The Mystic Seaport drew upon literature and other sources to accurately restore her to her original configuration and appearance. The painting of the hull black follows the Rattler, an 1855 Noank smack built by R. & J. Palmer; previous to it hulls were painted "bottle green". Further evidence is the painting of the 1867 Noank smack Mary E. Hoxie by Elisha Baker, depicting the black hull.

The choice to restore the ship to its original sloop condition was not universally accepted. Jack Wilbur, a Noank boat builder and master mariner, believes the return to the sloop rigging was nonsensical because it went against the way the ship sailed from its early years, as a schooner. Wilbur states that the schooner rig served the Emma C. Berry longer than the entire lives of those who made the decision.

Importance 
The National Historic Landmark nomination form states that, "the sloop smack Emma C. Berry is the last known surviving American smack." Important as the last surviving American well smack and with a lengthy service life, the ship is typical of the Noank smacks of the era.

See also

 List of National Historic Landmarks in Connecticut
 National Register of Historic Places listings in New London County, Connecticut
 List of museum ships

References

Mystic, Connecticut
National Historic Landmarks in Connecticut
Ships on the National Register of Historic Places in Connecticut
Museum ships in Mystic, Connecticut
Individual sailing vessels
National Register of Historic Places in New London County, Connecticut
Historic district contributing properties in Connecticut
Ships built in Groton, Connecticut
Fishing ships of the United States
Sloops of the United States